Burgos Alimenta Women Cycling Sport is a Spanish women's cycling team, that was established for the 2020 season. After initially being denied a UCI Women's Continental Team licence at the start of the season, the team acquired one midway through the year.

Team roster

National Champions
2021
 Czech Republic Road Race, Tereza Neumanová
 Cyprus Time Trial, Antri Christoforou
 Cyprus Road Race, Antri Christoforou

References

External links

Cycling teams based in Spain
Cycling teams established in 2019